This article is a list of King's and Queen's commissioners of the province of North Holland, Netherlands.

List of governors and King's and Queen's commissioners of North Holland

References

North Holland